Greatest Hits is the first compilation album by American country pop group Exile. It was released in 1986 via Epic Records.

Track listing

Chart performance

References

1986 compilation albums
Exile (American band) albums
Epic Records compilation albums